The 2018–19 Erkekler Basketbol Süper Ligi season, was the premier men's basketball competition in Northern Cyprus.

Competition format
Seven teams joined the regular season and competed in a double-legged round-robin tournament. The four best qualified teams of the regular season joined the playoffs.

Teams

Regular season

League table

Results

Playoffs

Bracket
Semifinals were played in a best-of-five games (2-2-1), while the finals, in a best-of-seven one (2-2-1-1-1).

Semifinals

|}

Finals

|}

References

External links
TRNC Basketball Federation

Northern Cyprus
Basketball in Northern Cyprus